Zygophylacidae is a family of hydrozoans.

Genera
The following genera are recognized in the family Zygophylacidae:

Abietinella Levinsen, 1913
Cryptolaria Busk, 1857
Zygophylax Quelch, 1885

References

 
Leptothecata
Cnidarian families